Tusk-e Olya (also Romanized as Tūsk-e ‘Olyā; also known as Tūsk and Tūsk-e Bālā) is a village in Jowzan Rural District, in the Central District of Malayer County, Hamadan Province, Iran. At the 2006 census, its population was 628, in 149 families.

References 

Populated places in Malayer County